ChechenAvto is a Chechen automobile manufacturer based in Argun, Chechen Republic. Established as a machine-building plant in 1960, it acquired its current status in 2008. It was known as Pishchemash until 1991, and was part of the Malyshev Factory industrial group.

The first vehicles came out of the plant in 2009, but it was closed the following year for modernization, with production resuming in 2011. The yearly output was initially projected at 50,000 vehicles, but only 6,700 cars were produced in 2016. In 2014 it was reported that cars produced in the plant have a poor reputation for quality, which is said to be lower compared to AvtoVAZ cars manufactured elsewhere.

Production
 Lada Priora
 Lada Granta
 Chaborz M-3 military buggy

References

External links
 Official website (archive)

Motor vehicle assembly plants in Russia
Vehicle manufacturing companies established in 1960
Companies based in Chechnya
Government-owned companies of Russia
1960 establishments in the Soviet Union